Laguna City is one of the 40 constituencies in the Kwun Tong District of Hong Kong. It was created in 1991.

The constituency has an estimated population of  It is based on Laguna City, a large-scale private housing estate in Sai Tso Wan near Cha Kwo Ling.

Councillors represented

Election results

2010s

References

Constituencies of Kwun Tong District Council
1991 establishments in Hong Kong
Constituencies established in 1991
Lam Tin